Valentin Ferron (born 8 February 1998) is a French cyclist, who currently rides for UCI ProTeam . In October 2020, he was named in the startlist for the 2020 Vuelta a España.

Major results
2016
 3rd Overall Oberösterreich Juniorenrundfahrt
 9th Bernaudeau Junior
2019
 2nd Polynormande
2021
 1st Stage 4 Tour du Rwanda
 3rd Trofeo Matteotti
 9th Boucles de l'Aulne
2022
 1st Stage 6 Critérium du Dauphiné
 2nd Paris–Camembert
 3rd Route Adélie
 4th Circuito de Getxo
 9th Overall Tour Poitou-Charentes en Nouvelle-Aquitaine
2023
 2nd Grand Prix La Marseillaise

Grand Tour general classification results timeline

References

External links

1998 births
Living people
French male cyclists
Sportspeople from Vienne, Isère
Cyclists from Auvergne-Rhône-Alpes
21st-century French people